Lampanyctus omostigma is a species of lanternfish.

References

omostigma
Fish described in 1908